Tomb Raider Collectible Card Game is an out-of-print collectible card game by Precedence based on the Tomb Raider franchise. It was first released in August 1999. The Premier set contained 210 cards. Two expansions were released for the game: Slippery When Wet in December 1999 (209 cards) and Big Guns in April 2000 (159 cards). A third expansion called Uncovered was planned for summer of 2000 but never materialized. The game incorporated gameplay elements better suited for board games.

Tomb Raider CCG was nominated for an Origins Award in 1999.

References

Collectible card games
Card games introduced in 1999
Works based on Tomb Raider